Club Atletico 3 de Febrero 2016-2021
Goles (2016)9 goles
Goles (2017) 9 goles
Goles (2018) 8 goles
Goles (2019) 7 goles
Actualidad 2021 10 goles...

Digno Javier González Sosa (born 12 May 1990) is a Paraguayan football forward who currently plays for Peruvian Primera División side Real Garcilaso.

Career
In December 2021 of Paraguay's summer transfer window, Gonzalez joined Sportivo Luqueño.

References

External links
 BDFA profile

1990 births
Living people
People from Caraguatay, Paraguay
Paraguayan footballers
Association football forwards
Cerro Porteño players
Club Rubio Ñu footballers
Rangers de Talca footballers
Atlético Huila footballers
Real Cartagena footballers
Real Garcilaso footballers
Club Atlético 3 de Febrero players
Paraguayan Primera División players
Primera B de Chile players
Categoría Primera A players
Paraguay under-20 international footballers
Paraguayan expatriate footballers
Expatriate footballers in Chile
Expatriate footballers in Colombia
Expatriate footballers in Peru